Mycolicibacillus trivialis (formerly Mycobacterium triviale) is a species of Mycolicibacillus. It is known to cause relapsing peritonitis.

References

External links
Type strain of Mycolicibacillus triviale at BacDive -  the Bacterial Diversity Metadatabase

Acid-fast bacilli
triviale
Bacteria described in 1970